Sophie is a feminine given name also spelled Sophy.

Sophie or Sophy may also refer to:

Arts and entertainment
Sophie (musician) (1986–2021), Scottish record producer, singer, songwriter, and DJ
Sophie (album), by BulletBoys, 2003
"Sophie" (song), by Goodshirt, 2002
Sophie (book series), six children's books by Dick King-Smith and David Parkins
Sophie (TV series), a Canadian sitcom
Sophie: A Murder in West Cork, a 2021 TV documentary about the death of Sophie Toscan du Plantier

Ships
HMS Sophie, several British warships
SMS Sophie, 1881 member of the Carola class of steam corvettes

Other uses
Sophie (digital library), a digital library of works by German-speaking women
Sophie, Ouest, a village in the Ouest department of Haiti
SOPHIE échelle spectrograph, a French astronomical instrument
Sophy (Safavid Empire), a reference to the ruler of the Safavid dynasty of Iran
Sophie Prize, an international environment and development prize
Sophie the Giraffe, a teething toy for babies
Sophy (Safavid Iran), a term for the ruler of the Safavid dynasty of Iran

See also
Sophia (given name)
Miss Sophie (disambiguation)
Sophie's Choice (novel), a 1979 novel by William Styron
Sophie's Choice (film), a 1982 film adapted from the novel
Sophie's World, a 1991 novel by Jostein Gaarder